Mucuri is a city in the state of Bahia in Brazil. The estimated population in 2020 is 42,251 inhabitants. It is the southernmost city in Bahia as well as Brazil's Northeast region, and the only one from that state to border Espírito Santo.

The city contains part of the  Córrego Grande Biological Reserve.
The climate is tropical, warm and mostly humid, with one or two dry months.

Mucuri is served by Max Feffer Airport.

References 

Populated places established in 1938
Populated coastal places in Bahia
Municipalities in Bahia